Mariam Lashkhi (born 1 August 1988) is a Georgian politician. Since 2020, she has been a member of the Parliament of Georgia of the 10th convocation by party list, election bloc: „Georgian Dream - Democratic Georgia“.

References

Georgian Dream politicians
Members of the Parliament of Georgia
1988 births
Living people
21st-century politicians from Georgia (country)
21st-century women politicians from Georgia (country)